The 1919 Spring Hill Badgers football team represented the Spring Hill College as an independent during the 1919 college football season.

Schedule

References

Spring Hill
Spring Hill Badgers football seasons
Spring Hill Badgers football